Lewis Gibson (born 1 May 1994) is a Scottish ice dancer who represents Great Britain. With his skating partner, Lilah Fear, he is the 2023 European silver medalist, a four-time Grand Prix medalist, a two-time Challenger series  gold medalist, the 2018 Bavarian Open champion, and a five-time British national champion (2017, 2019–2020, 2022–2023).

Personal life 
Gibson was born on 1 May 1994 in Prestwick, Scotland. He was raised in Prestwick and played football before becoming interested in skating.

Gibson identifies as gay and is married to Joshua Walsh. For some time, he was reluctant to publicly discuss his sexuality due to concerns about homophobia within the judged sport of figure skating, but subsequently said, "I can't live never sharing who I am and sharing who I love."

Career

Early career 
Gibson began skating in 2006 in Scotland, training at Ayr Ice Rink and Stevenston's Auchenharvie Leisure Centre. He cited the first series of Dancing on Ice, hosted by British ice dance champions Jayne Torvill and Christopher Dean, as his initial inspiration to begin skating. In addition to his career in men's singles, he competed in pairs for two seasons. In 2010–11, he and Heather Murdoch won the novice pairs title at the British Championships. They received the bronze medal the following season.

As a single skater, Gibson was coached by Jennifer Holmes at Ayr and Auchenharvie rinks before moving up to the junior international level. He then went on to train under Leanne Collins in East Kilbride, Scotland. Competing on the senior level, he won silver at the British Championships in November 2013. In the 2014–15 season, he appeared at two Challenger Series competitions, placing thirteenth at the Lombardia Trophy and Volvo Open Cup, and took the silver medal at the Hamar Trophy in Norway. He ended his singles career in December 2015.

2016–2017 season: Debut of Fear/Gibson 
Gibson began a partnership with Lilah Fear, coached by Karen Quinn at the Alexandra Palace Ice Rink in London, England, and by Romain Haguenauer in Montreal, Quebec, Canada. The duo made their international debut in late July 2016 at the Lake Placid Ice Dance International, finishing eleventh. Ranked second in both segments, they received the silver medal at a Challenger Series event, the Lombardia Trophy in September. They placed fifth at the International Cup of Nice and fourth at the Open d'Andorra. In December, they won the British national title, in the absence of longtime champions Coomes/Buckland, and silver at the Santa Claus Cup in Hungary.

In January 2017, Fear/Gibson qualified to the final segment at the European Championships in Ostrava, Czech Republic; they ranked nineteenth in the short dance, fourteenth in the free dance, and fifteenth overall. They made their World Championship debut later that season, placing twenty-second.

2017–2018 season 
Beginning their second season together, Fear/Gibson placed sixth at the International Cup of Nice and won silver medals at the Open d'Andorra and the Ice Challenge. They competed in three Challenger events that season, placing ninth at both the 2017 CS Finlandia Trophy and 2017 CS Lombardia Trophy and fourth at the 2017 CS Warsaw Cup. Competing at the British Championships, they won the silver medal, this time behind a returning Coomes/Buckland. They subsequently competed again at the Santa Claus Cup, placing fourth.

At the end of the season, they were again sent as Great Britain's representation to the 2018 World Championships, placing twenty-fourth.

2018–2019 season: "Disco Brits" 

Wanting to challenge themselves, Fear/Gibson selected for their free dance a disco medley of songs by Donna Summer and Earth, Wind and Fire. Both professed as well to be fans of the genre. Gibson said, "A lot of the routines of recent times have been very slow and lyrical, but we wanted to do something fun and something that would stand out to help us make a name for ourselves." The free dance proved to be a huge success with audiences, facilitating what would be a dramatic rise up the international standings, and the team was nicknamed the "Disco Brits" by skating fans. Fear later credited the music selection as "a lucky choice, and from there, it completely redirected us to where we see ourselves going, what we feel is our style and what makes us unique."

Fear/Gibson began their season with two Challenger assignments, placing fourth at the 2018 CS Nebelhorn Trophy and fifth at the 2018 CS Ondrej Nepela Trophy. In October 2018, the two finished fifth at the 2018 Skate America – their Grand Prix debut. A month later, they improved their placement by finishing fourth at the 2018 NHK Trophy, achieving new personal bests in the free dance and overall score, and ranking second in the free dance.

After winning their second British national title, Fear/Gibson next competed at the 2019 European Championships, placing seventh in the rhythm dance and sixth in the free, for sixth place overall.  They were pleased with the result, Gibson commenting that they "came in with the goal of a top-ten finish after we came 15th two years ago. Now we’ve managed to get two spots for Great Britain next year, which is really exciting."  At the 2019 World Championships, they placed thirteenth, having made the free dance for the first time.

2019–2020 season: First Grand Prix medal 
After the success of their disco free dance the previous season, Fear and Gibson chose a Madonna medley for their new free dance, aiming to continue the momentum of past success with audience-pleasing choices. For the rhythm dance, required to be musical-themed, Gibson identified tracks from The Blues Brothers. Fear remarked that they "knew that could get the crowd on its feet, hopefully, and people would be tapping their toes."

Fear/Gibson began the season on the Challenger series, winning the silver medal at the 2019 CS Autumn Classic International after placing fifth in the rhythm dance and second in the free dance. At their second Challenger, the 2019 CS Nebelhorn Trophy, they placed sixth in the rhythm dance and third in the free, for fourth place overall.  Assigned to two Grand Prix events, they began at 2019 Skate Canada International, where they placed fourth in the rhythm dance and third in the free skate, taking the bronze medal.  This was the team's first Grand Prix medal and the first for a British team since 2014.  Gibson remarked: "For us, this is huge. We didn't expect it."  Competing again at the NHK Trophy, they were fourth in the rhythm dance, earning a perfect score on the Finnstep pattern dance for the first time.  They were third in the free dance, remaining in fourth place overall.

At the 2020 British Championships, Fear/Gibson placed first in the rhythm dance even though Fear had fallen out of the twizzles and placed first in the free winning their third national title by 73.37 points.  In what proved to be their final event of the season, they competed at the 2020 European Championships and placed sixth in the rhythm dance, with Fear losing a twizzle level and them getting only one of the four key points on the Finnstepp pattern dance.  Fifth in the free dance, they rose to fifth place overall.  They had been assigned to compete at the World Championships in Montreal, but these were cancelled as a result of the coronavirus pandemic.

2020–2021 season 
Fear/Gibson were assigned to the 2020 Skate Canada International, but this event was also cancelled due to the pandemic. As there were no British championships for the season as a result of the pandemic, on December 3, they were named to Britain's team for the European Championships, alongside Fear's younger sister Sasha. The competition was cancelled on December 10.

Fear/Gibson were again named to represent Britain at the 2021 World Championships in Stockholm, where they placed eighth in the rhythm dance before moving up to seventh place in the free dance, surpassing the Canadian team Fournier Beaudry/Sørensen by 0.04 points.  Their results qualified a second dance berth for Great Britain at the following year's World Championships and the possibility of a second place at the 2022 Winter Olympics in Beijing.

2021–2022 season: Beijing Olympics 
For their new free dance for the season, Fear/Gibson chose Hans Zimmer's soundtrack from The Lion King, citing it as a "universal" story about "finding your inner strength." They selected a medley of KISS songs for the rhythm dance, which Gibson attributed to "nostalgia and the want to entertain. That’s what we love to do."

Fear/Gibson began the season at the 2021 CS Finlandia Trophy, winning the bronze medal. At their first Grand Prix assignment, the 2021 Skate Canada International, Fear/Gibson made errors in both segments of the competition, ending up in an unexpectedly low seventh place. Gibson said it was "not what we wanted to do, but we felt strong and connected in the free dance." Following this, they dedicated intensive training time in the short interval before their second event, the 2021 NHK Trophy. Third in both segments there, despite a twizzle error from Gibson in the free dance, they won the bronze medal after finishing fourth in two previous appearances at the Japanese Grand Prix. Fear said, "we were really hungry to come out here to make progress, and I feel like we did that."

After winning the Open d'Andorra and their fourth British national title, Fear/Gibson were assigned to the British Olympic team. Gibson remarked, "to feel like years and years of hard work and dedication have paid off is truly one of the most satisfying things." At the 2022 European Championships, Fear/Gibson were fourth in the rhythm dance but fell to fifth place after a twizzle error from Gibson in the free dance.

Competing at the 2022 Winter Olympics in the dance event, Fear/Gibson were tenth in the rhythm dance. They were ninth in the free dance, remaining tenth overall. They finished the season at the 2022 World Championships, held with the Russian dance teams absent due to the International Skating Union banning all Russian athletes due to their country's invasion of Ukraine. They were seventh in the rhythm dance but rose to sixth with a new personal best in the free dance.

2022–2023 season: European silver 
Fear and Gibson selected for their free dance a medley of Lady Gaga songs, including "Born This Way" which Fear said, "we are really motivated by the message" of. They began the season at the inaugural edition of British Ice Skating's Britannia Cup, winning the gold medal. They appeared twice on the Challenger circuit, winning gold at both the 2022 CS U.S. Classic and the 2022 CS Nebelhorn Trophy, and setting new personal bests at the latter.

On the Grand Prix at the 2022 Skate Canada International, the team again set new personal bests on their way to a silver medal finish. Two weeks later, they were given the unique opportunity to participate in a Grand Prix event on home soil, as the British federation had stepped up to host the 2022 MK John Wilson Trophy in lieu of the Cup of China, which had been cancelled due to Chinese pandemic measures. Gibson "really didn't think a home Grand Prix would ever happen." They placed second in the rhythm dance, 0.93 points behind Italians Guignard/Fabbri. With the stands full of fans touting the Union Jack and, in one instance in support of Gibson, the Saltire, both called it a remarkable experience, Fear noting "we're used to seeing that in other countries for their home teams, so the fact that it was for us was such a surprise." In the free dance, Gibson lost control during their choreographic twizzle element, resulting in them scoring below their personal best, but they remained second in the segment overall to take their second silver medal. Their results qualified them for the Grand Prix Final. They were the first British team to qualify for the Final since Sinead and John Kerr in 2009.

Fear/Gibson won their fifth British national title at the beginning of December, with Gibson saying on the occasion, "it's always such a special honour to etch our names again onto one of the most prestigious trophies in Great Britain sports." They were fifth in the rhythm dance at the Grand Prix Final in Turin. Fear likened the experience of the Final to "a dream in Disneyland." They were fourth in the free dance and rose to fourth overall following a major error by Canadian training partners Fournier Beaudry/Sørensen, who dropped to sixth. Fear and Gibson said that they were pleased by the experience and anticipating working on their levelled elements in advance of the European Championships, where they were expected to be in medal contention.

At the 2023 European Championships in Espoo, Fear/Gibson entered hoping to challenge Guignard/Fabbri for the gold medal. They scored 84.12 in the rhythm dance, close to their personal best, finishing second in that segment behind the Italians and claiming their first European small medal. They were second in the free dance as well, winning the silver medal, their first ISU championship medal. This was the first European medal for a British team since Penny Coomes/Nicholas Buckland in 2014, and the highest placement on the podium since Torvill/Dean's gold in 1994.

Programs

Ice dance with Fear

Men's singles

Competitive highlights 
GP: Grand Prix; CS: Challenger Series

Ice dance with Fear

Men's singles

Pairs with Murdoch

References

External links 
 

1994 births
Scottish male ice dancers
Scottish male single skaters
Scottish LGBT sportspeople
Living people
People from Prestwick
Sportspeople from South Ayrshire
Gay sportsmen
Figure skaters at the 2022 Winter Olympics
Olympic figure skaters of Great Britain
Olympic athletes of Great Britain
LGBT figure skaters
21st-century LGBT people